Greenacres (formerly, Green Acres) is a census-designated place in Kern County, California. The population was 5,566 at the 2010 census.

Greenacres was founded in 1930.

Geography

Demographics

At the 2010 census Greenacres had a population of 5,566. The racial makeup of Greenacres was 4,612 (82.9%) White, 49 (0.9%) African American, 116 (2.1%) Native American, 70 (1.3%) Asian, 8 (0.1%) Pacific Islander, 511 (9.2%) from other races, and 200 (3.6%) from two or more races. Hispanic or Latino of any race were 1,119 persons (20.1%).

The census reported that 5,563 people (99.9% of the population) lived in households, 3 (0.1%) lived in non-institutionalized group quarters, and no one was institutionalized.

There were 1,940 households, 713 (36.8%) had children under the age of 18 living in them, 1,087 (56.0%) were opposite-sex married couples living together, 253 (13.0%) had a female householder with no husband present, 124 (6.4%) had a male householder with no wife present.  There were 104 (5.4%) unmarried opposite-sex partnerships, and 20 (1.0%) same-sex married couples or partnerships. 376 households (19.4%) were one person and 155 (8.0%) had someone living alone who was 65 or older. The average household size was 2.87.  There were 1,464 families (75.5% of households); the average family size was 3.27.

The age distribution was 1,401 people (25.2%) under the age of 18, 541 people (9.7%) aged 18 to 24, 1,337 people (24.0%) aged 25 to 44, 1,558 people (28.0%) aged 45 to 64, and 729 people (13.1%) who were 65 or older.  The median age was 37.9 years. For every 100 females, there were 99.8 males.  For every 100 females age 18 and over, there were 98.1 males.

There were 2,062 housing units at an average density of 1,034.9 per square mile, of the occupied units 1,455 (75.0%) were owner-occupied and 485 (25.0%) were rented. The homeowner vacancy rate was 1.9%; the rental vacancy rate was 5.3%.  4,059 people (72.9% of the population) lived in owner-occupied housing units and 1,504 people (27.0%) lived in rental housing units.

References

Census-designated places in Kern County, California
Populated places established in 1930
Census-designated places in California